The 2015 Southern Illinois Salukis football team represented Southern Illinois University Carbondale as a member of the Missouri Valley Football Conference (MVFC) during the 2015 NCAA Division I FCS football season. Led by Dale Lennon in his eighth and final season as head coach, the Salukis compiled an overall record of 3–8 with a mark of 2–6 in conference play, placing ninth in the MVFC. Southern Illinois played home games at Saluki Stadium in Carbondale, Illinois.

On November 30, head coach Lennon was fired. He finished his tenure at Southern Illinois with an eight-year record of 51–42.

Schedule

Game summaries

at Indiana

at Southeast Missouri State

Liberty

at Western Illinois

Missouri State

at Indiana State

Youngstown State

North Dakota State

at South Dakota

Illinois State

at Northern Iowa

References

Southern Illinois
Southern Illinois Salukis football seasons
Southern Illinois Salukis football